Malamuth is a surname. Notable people with the surname include:

Charles Malamuth (1899–1965), Polish-Jewish-American journalist
Neil Malamuth, American psychologist